Ivana Božović  (born 28 January 1991) is a Montenegrin handballer who plays for Pogoń Szczecin and the Montenegro national team.

International honours 
EHF Champions League:
Winner: 2012
EHF Cup:
Winner: 2010

References

1991 births
Living people
Montenegrin female handball players
Sportspeople from Podgorica 
Montenegrin expatriate sportspeople in Croatia
Montenegrin expatriate sportspeople in Poland
Montenegrin expatriate sportspeople in Romania
Expatriate handball players 
Mediterranean Games medalists in handball
Mediterranean Games bronze medalists for Montenegro
Competitors at the 2009 Mediterranean Games